Kenneth Kamwi Matengu (born 1978 in Katima Mulilo, Namibia) is a Namibian professor and vice-chancellor of the University of Namibia since 2018 after he replaced retired Prof. Lazarus Hangula in August 2018. He was Pro-Vice Chancellor for Research, Innovation and Resources Mobilization at the University of Namibia from 2016 to 2018. On 29 June 2018, Matengu was appointed as the third vice-chancellor of the University of Namibia becoming the youngest person to assume the position.

Education

Matengu did his high school at Caprivi Senior Secondary. He holds a
Certificate in International Relations from the University of Tampere, Bachelor's degree in Geography and Sociology from the University of Namibia, Doctor of Philosophy, Ph.D (exemia cum laude) in Innovation Diffusion and Development from the University of Eastern Finland. He has published 50 peer review articles, books and book chapters, as well as international conference papers.

References

1978 births
Living people
People from Katima Mulilo
University of Tampere alumni
University of Namibia alumni
University of Eastern Finland alumni
Academic staff of the University of Namibia